Ezhieh (also Romanized as Ezhīyeh, Azhyeh, Ezhyeh, and Ezhiyeh) is a city in Jolgeh District, Isfahan County, Isfahan Province, Iran. At the 2006 census, its population was 3,309, in 948 families.

References

Populated places in Isfahan County

Cities in Isfahan Province